The 2010 Winchester Council election took place on 6 May 2010 to elect members of Winchester District Council in Hampshire, England. One third of the council was up for election and the Liberal Democrats gained overall control of the council from the Conservative Party.

After the election, the composition of the council was:
Liberal Democrat 29
Conservative 26
Independent 2

Campaign
The Conservatives had gained control of Winchester council in the 2006 election after a sex scandal involving the local Liberal Democrat MP Mark Oaten. Going into the 2010 election the Conservatives had a majority of just 1 seat and were defending 13 seats compared to 4 for the Liberal Democrats, due to the seats they won in 2006 being due for election in 2010. Several councillors stood down at the election, including George Hollingbery from The Alresfords ward to contest the Meon Valley constituency in the general election, Fred Allgood from Denmead ward, Georgina Busher from Bishop's Waltham and James Stephens from St Luke ward. Brian Collin also did not defend his Olivers Battery and Badger Farm ward, which he had held for 24 years, to contest St John and All Saints instead.

The Conservatives defended their record on the council pointing to a repaving of the high street, park and ride projects and keeping council tax increases below inflation. However the Liberal Democrats accused the Conservatives of running down reserves that the Liberal Democrats had built up when they were in power and were confident of taking control in particular with the election taking place at the same time as the general election. The Labour Party were defending their last seat on the council in St John and All Saints ward with predictions that Labour could be without representation on the council for the first time. Meanwhile, the Green Party only contested one seat in St Bartholomew in order to concentrate their efforts and campaigned on development issues.

Election result
The results saw the Liberal Democrats take control over the council after gaining 5 seats to hold 29 of the 57 seats. This gave them an overall majority of 1 seat, despite the Conservatives winning 10 seats at the election compared to 9 for the Liberal Democrats. The Conservatives did make one gain, taking a former independent seat where the councillor Georgina Busher stood down at the election. Meanwhile, the last remaining Labour seat was lost after Labour was defeated in St John and All Saints ward.

Ward results

Bishops Waltham

Cheriton & Bishops Sutton

Colden Common & Twyford

Denmead

Droxford, Soberton & Hambledon

Kings Worthy

Olivers Battery & Badger Farm

Owslebury & Curdridge

St Barnabas

St Bartholomew

St John & All Saints

St Luke

St Michael

St Paul

Shedfield

Sparsholt

Swanmore & Newton

The Alresfords

Wonston & Micheldever

References

2010
2010 English local elections
May 2010 events in the United Kingdom
2010s in Hampshire